Comparative Studies of South Asia, Africa and the Middle East is a triannual peer-reviewed academic journal covering Comparative Studies on Africa, the Middle East, and South Asia. It provides a "critical and comparative analyses of the histories, cultural productions, social and gender relations, politics, and economies" of these regions. It is published by the Duke University Press, and since 2012, edited at Columbia University.

Abstracting and indexing
The journal is abstracted and indexed in:

Arab World Research Source
CSA (Linguistics & Language Behavior Abstracts, Sociological Abstracts, Worldwide Political Science Abstracts)
EBSCO databases (Historical Abstracts, Political Science Complete, Public Affairs Index)
Emerging Sources Citation Index
GEOBASE
Index Islamicus
International Bibliography of Periodical Literature
International Bibliography of the Social Sciences
Modern Language Association Database
ProQuest
Scopus

History
The journal came into existence in 1993 as an expansion of South Asia Bulletin journal which was established in 1981. In 1993 and 1994, the issues of South Asia Bulletin were published with the sub-title Comparative Studies of South Asia, Africa and the Middle East. In 1995, South Asia Bulletin was merged with the journal.

Editors-in-chief
Marwa Elshakry and Steven Pierce (2021–present) 
Marwa Elshakry, Steven Pierce and Anupama Rao (2020–2021)
Anupama Rao and Marwa Elshakry (2019–2020)
Timothy Mitchell and Anupama Rao (2014–2018)
Mohamad Tavakoli-Targhi (2001–2012)
Sucheta Mazumdar and Vasant Kaiwar (founding editors)

Notes

References

External links

Publications established in 1993
Multidisciplinary social science journals
Academic journals published in the United States
Duke University Press academic journals
Triannual journals
English-language journals